The 2023 season will be the Tampa Bay Buccaneers' upcoming 48th in the National Football League, their tenth under the leadership of general manager Jason Licht and their second under head coach Todd Bowles. They will attempt to improve upon their 8-9 record from the previous season and they will also enter this season as defending back-to-back NFC South champions.
This will be their first season since 2019 without quarterback Tom Brady, after he announced his second retirement from the NFL on February 1, 2023. This will also be their first season since 2013 without tight end Cameron Brate, as he was released on March 17.

Draft

Draft trades
 The Buccaneers traded a fourth-round selection to the Jacksonville Jaguars in exchange for 2022 fifth and sixth-round selections (157th and 235th overall).
The Buccaneers traded LB Grant Stuard and a seventh-round selection to the Indianapolis Colts in exchange for a sixth-round selection.
 The Buccaneers traded a 2022 sixth-round selection (206th overall) to the New York Jets in exchange for NT Steve McLendon and a seventh-round selection.
 The Buccaneers traded G Shaq Mason and a seventh-round pick (230th overall) to the Houston Texans in exchange for a sixth-round selection.

Staff

Current roster

Preseason
The Buccaneers' preseason opponents and schedule will be announced in the spring.

Regular season

2023 opponents
Listed below are the Buccaneers' opponents for 2023. Exact dates and times will be announced in the spring.

References

External links
 

Tampa Bay
Tampa Bay Buccaneers seasons
Tampa Bay Buccaneers